Osborn Larsson (born 30 May 1951) is a Swedish retired footballer (defender) who most notably played for GAIS in Swedish football division Allsvenskan. Osborn was born in Kungshamn, Sweden. He transferred to GAIS from Stångenäs in 1974. He played 193 games as left back for GAIS, scoring 4 goals, before he left in 1982. Osborn became a legend in GAIS and is still mentioned in various cheers.

References

Living people
Swedish footballers
GAIS players
1951 births
People from Sotenäs Municipality
Association football defenders
Sportspeople from Västra Götaland County